Larimichthys is a genus of drum fish commonly known as yellow croakers. Pseudosciaena is a commonly used but invalid synonym for Larimichthys. The genus includes major fishery species in the Northwest Pacific, principally by China: with a catch of 438 thousand tonnes in 2012, small yellow croaker Larimichthys polyactis is 24th among the 70 "principal" capture species, and also the annual catches of large yellow croaker Larimichthys crocea are significant at 70 thousand tonnes.

Species
There are currently 4 recognized species in this genus:
 Larimichthys crocea (J. Richardson, 1846)—large yellow croaker
 Larimichthys pamoides	(Munro, 1964)—southern yellow croaker
 Larimichthys polyactis (Bleeker, 1877)—(small) yellow croaker
 Larimichthys terengganui (Seah, Hanafi, Mazlan & Chao, 2015)

References

Sciaenidae
Taxa named by David Starr Jordan